Hakka cuisine is the cooking style of the Hakka people, and it may also be found in parts of Taiwan and in countries with significant overseas Hakka communities. There are numerous restaurants in Mainland China, Taiwan, Hong Kong, Indonesia, Malaysia, Singapore, India and Thailand serving Hakka cuisine. Hakka cuisine was listed in 2014 on the first Hong Kong Inventory of Intangible Cultural Heritage.

The Hakka people have a marked cuisine and style of Chinese cooking which is little known outside the Hakka home. It concentrates on the texture of food – the hallmark of Hakka cuisine. Whereas preserved meats feature in Hakka delicacy, stewed, braised, roast meats – 'texturized' contributions to the Hakka palate – have a central place in their repertoire. Preserved vegetables are commonly used for steamed and braised dishes such as steamed minced pork with preserved vegetables and braised pork with salted vegetables.  In fact, the raw materials for Hakka food are no different from raw materials for any other type of regional Chinese cuisine where what is  cooked depends on what is available in the market. Hakka cuisine may be described as outwardly simple but tasty. The skill in Hakka cuisine lies in the ability to cook meat thoroughly without hardening it, and to naturally bring out the proteinous flavor (umami taste) of meat.

The Hakka who settled in the harbor and port areas of Hong Kong placed great emphasis on seafood cuisine. Hakka cuisine in Hong Kong is less dominated by expensive meats; instead, emphasis is placed on an abundance of vegetables. Pragmatic and simple, Hakka cuisine is garnished lightly with sparse or little flavoring. Modern Hakka cooking in Hong Kong favors offal, an example being deep-fried intestines. Others include tofu with preservatives, along with their signature dish, salt baked chicken. Another specialty is the poon choi. While it may be difficult to prove these were the actual diets of the old Hakka community, it is at present a commonly accepted view. The above dishes and their variations are in fact found and consumed throughout China, including Guangdong Province, and are not particularly unique or confined to the Hakka population.

Besides meat as source of protein, there is a unique vegan dish called lei cha. It comprises combinations of vegetables and beans. Although not specifically unique for all Hakka people but are definitely famous among the Hakka-Hopo families. This vegetable-based rice tea dish is gaining momentum in some multicultural countries like Malaysia. Cooking of this dish requires the help from other family members to complete all eight combinations. It helps foster the relationship between family members in return.

Steamed bun is a popular snack for Hakka people. It is mainly made from glutinous rice and is available in sweet or salty options. Sweet version consists of sweetened black-eyed pea pastes or peanuts. Salty version consists of preserved radish.

Notable dishes
Hakka food also includes other traditional Taiwanese dishes, just as other Taiwanese ethnic groups do. Some of the more notable dishes in Hakka cuisine are listed as follow:

Hakka cuisine in South Asia

In India, Pakistan and other regions with significant South Asian populations, the locally known "Hakka cuisine" is actually a local adaptation of original Hakka dishes. This variation of Hakka cuisine is in reality, mostly Indian Chinese cuisine and Pakistani Chinese cuisine. It is called "Hakka cuisine" because, in India and areas of Pakistan, many owners of restaurants who serve this cuisine are of Hakka origin. Typical dishes include 'chilli chicken' and 'Dongbei (northeastern) chow mein/hakka noodles' (an Indian version of real Northeastern Chinese cuisine), and these restaurants also serve traditional South Asian dishes such as pakora. Being very popular in these areas, this style of cuisine is often mistakenly credited as being representative of Hakka cuisine in general, whereas the authentic style of Hakka cuisine is rarely known in these regions.

Outside of South Asia, the premier place to enjoy Indian-Pakistani-Chinese cuisine is in Toronto, Canada, due to the large number of Chinese from South Asia who have emigrated to the region and have chosen to open restaurants and most of it being halal. In Toronto, "hakka Chinese food" almost universally refers to Indian-Chinese cuisine, not Hakka cuisine in general.

Hakka cuisine in Thailand
In Thailand, Bangkok's Chinatown is Yaowarat and including neighboring areas such as Sampheng, Charoen Chai, Charoen Krung, Suan Mali, Phlapphla Chai or Wong Wian Yi Sip Song Karakadakhom (July 22 Circle). In the past, many Hakka restaurants are located in the Suan Mali near Bangkok Metropolitan Administration General Hospital. But now they had moved into many places, such as Talad Phlu, which is also one of the Chinatown as well.

See also

 Taiwanese cuisine

References

External links
 The Hakka Cookbook (author website)

 
Hakka
Regional cuisines of China